Mohammed Ezz al-Din Khalouf is a Free Syrian Army major general who defected from the Army to the FSA in March 2013. After his defection, he fled with his wife and three children (including the Army captain Ezz al-Din Khalouf) from Damascus to Jordan with the help of the opposition.

References

Syrian generals
Members of the Free Syrian Army